Micah H. Naftalin (1933 - December 23, 2009) was an American advocate for the rights of Soviet Jews. He was national director of the Union of Councils for Soviet Jews from February 1987 until his death.

Naftalin held a BA from Brandeis University (1955) and a JD from The George Washington University School of Law (1960). He served in Korea as an enlisted man in the U.S. Army from 1955 to 1957.

Before joining UCSJ, he served as an aide to U.S. Congressman Carl Elliott, as chief counsel and deputy director of the U.S. House of Representatives’ Select Committee on Government Research and as a senior policy analyst with the National Academy of Sciences. In 1982, he joined chairman Elie Wiesel on the United States Holocaust Memorial Council, which led the efforts to establish the United States Holocaust Memorial Museum; Naftalin was appointed deputy director and, later, acting director.

Naftalin died in Washington, DC.

References

External links
 "UCSJ mourns the death of its national director" [press release] (December 23, 2009). UCSJ. Archive of the Jewish Aliya Movement in the USSR 
 Records of Union of Councils for Soviet Jews at the American Jewish Historical Society at the Center for Jewish History.

1933 births
2009 deaths
United States Army soldiers
Brandeis University alumni
George Washington University Law School alumni
American human rights activists
Minority rights activists